A stammer or stutter is a speech disorder typified by the involuntary repetition of a sound or sounds. 

Stammer may also refer to: 
 "Stammer", a song by the Supernaturals from It Doesn't Matter Anymore

People with the surname
 Kay Stammers (1914-2005), British tennis player
 Keith Stammers, 20th-century English politician
 Richard Stammers, special effects artist
 Stan Stammers (born 1961), British punk musician

See also
List of people known as the Stammerer
Stamer
Stahmer